The Pearl Island in Doha, Qatar, is an artificial island with an area of nearly four square kilometers. It is the first land in Qatar to be available for freehold ownership by foreign nationals. As of 2018, there were 27,000 residents.

Once fully completed, The Pearl was expected to create over 32 kilometers of new coastline, for use as a residential estate with an expected 18,831 dwellings and 45,000 residents by 2018.

In 2004, when the project was first revealed, the initial cost of constructing the island stood at $2.5 billion. It is now believed the project will cost $15 billion upon completion.

Residential development
Residential development on the island is intended to incorporate various national and international themes, including aspects of Arabic, Mediterranean, and European culture. The Pearl Island is divided into 12 districts (also referred to as precincts), each of which has a distinct architectural style.

Porto Arabia Towers
Total number of towers will be 31 with a total of 4,700 apartments. The address format is Unit 1234, 1 Porto Arabia. Some references use PA-1 for convenience.

Viva Bahriya Towers
There will be 29 towers total. The address format is "Unit 1234, 1 Viva Bahriya", with "VB‑1" being the shorter, convenient version.

Qanat Quartier

The Pearl Island's "Venice-like community" has an extensive canal system, pedestrian-friendly squares and plazas and beachfront townhouses. The first residents started to live in Qanat Quartier in 2012. When complete there will be:
 977 residential apartments in 31 buildings
 188 townhouses
 15 bridges, including a replica of Venice's Rialto Bridge
 200 retail units
 320,000 square feet of retail space
 1,135 parking spaces for cars
 200 moorings in the marina                 
 Kempinski Resort and Spa

Abraj Quartier
This precinct is located by the entrance of The Pearl Qatar, and will have 7 towers including the tallest buildings planned for the development, at 40 storeys high.

Commercial attractions

The Central Authority Directorate (TCAD), which provides services like property registration and residency permits, opened on 3 December 2011.

Restaurants
The Pearl Island has several restaurants,  as well as a coffee bar. Midori, a Japanese restaurant in Porto Arabia, won Best Newcomer in the Time Out Doha Awards 2012. Pampano, also operated by Hospitality Development Company (HDC), a fully owned subsidiary of United Development Company (UDC), the primary developer of The Pearl Island, received the "Highly Commended" certificate in the Best South American category.

Hotels

Marsa Malaz Kempinski is the largest hotel in The Pearl, and is located on its own islet. The hotel features 281 rooms, a 1,100 m2 ballroom and conference halls. It has a beach with provisions for water sports and swimming, a 3,000  m2 spa and tennis facilities. Boat tours are offered by the hotel. Seven restaurants are located in the hotel.

Transport
Modes of transport varies from precinct to precinct. Golf carts are heavily used in Porto Arabia and Medina Centrale, while boat taxis are available in Porto Arabia and Qanat Quartier. Limousines are available in Porto Arabia, Medina Centrale, Qanat Quartier and Viva Bahriya.

Gallery

See also
Lusail
Land reclamation

References

External links
The Pearl Island – Official Website

Islands of Qatar
Artificial islands of Qatar
Doha